Island of Roses: The Jews of Rhodes in Los Angeles is a 1995 documentary about the dying Sephardic community in Los Angeles. The film shares interviews with some of the last surviving immigrants, who offer nostalgic memories of their lost home, and explores how the once vibrant community of Rhodes Jews in Los Angeles now struggles to preserve its traditions as younger, assimilated generations have to make a conscious effort to maintain the practices of their ancestors.

Summary
The Sephardic Jews of Rhodes were once Spaniards who came to find an idyllic new home in the Greek island of Rhodes. The same night that Christopher Columbus set sail in 1492, the King and Queen of Spain forced all Jews out of their country. Sephardic refugees settled throughout the Mediterranean, and a large number of them chose to make their home on the beautiful Rhodes, where almond and lemon trees grew and the smell of roses was always in the air.

For centuries the Jews of Rhodes lived peacefully under the Ottoman-Turkish rule, preserving the medieval form of the Ladino language they took with them from Spain and practicing their own distinct Sephardic traditions. But the quiet island was invaded by Germany in 1944, and Rhodes Jews were among the many sent off in cattle cars to their deaths.

The Mediterranean island of Rhodes was once heavily populated by Jews, but only a few still live there today. Many of those who survived and fled World War II and its aftermath immigrated to Los Angeles, where the warm weather and sunny beach reminded them of home.

Awards
Silver Screen Award at the US International Film and Video Festival, 1995

See also
Trees Cry for Rain—another documentary about Sephardic culture

Other documentaries about unique Jewish communities in America:
A Home on the Range
Song of a Jewish Cowboy
Birth of a Community: Jews and the Gold Rush
Pushcarts and Plantations: Jewish Life in Louisiana
Echoes from a Ghost Minyan
Jews and Buddhism

References

External links
The Jewish Channel's review
National Center for Jewish film
Hollywood.com write-up
article on Sephardic Jews

1995 films
American documentary films
Documentary films about Jews and Judaism in the United States
Documentary films about Los Angeles
Documentary films about United States history
Greek-American culture in California
Greek-Jewish culture in the United States
Jewish-American history in California
Jewish Rhodian history
Jews and Judaism in Los Angeles
Historic Jewish communities in the United States
History of Los Angeles
Sephardi Jewish culture in California
Spanish-American culture in California
Spanish-Jewish culture in the United States
Turkish-Jewish culture in the United States
1990s American films